Peniculus is a genus of marine copepods in the family Pennellidae. They occur worldwide and typically parasitize coastal or epipelagic fish, with the exception of Peniculus hokutoae that was found parasitizing a mesopelagic myctophid, Symbolophorus evermanni.

Species
There are 11 recognized species:

References

Siphonostomatoida
Copepod genera
Taxa named by Alexander von Nordmann